Dr. Gordon Reginald Ward (23 February 1885 – 10 July 1962) was a British philatelist who signed the Roll of Distinguished Philatelists in 1953.

Publications
War Time Posts of Malta. 1950.
The Springbok Half-Penny of South Africa. 1956.
South Africa - The Ship Penny.
KG V 1½d, Die 2, of Australia. 1950.
KG V 5d of Australia. 1953.
Franco Heads Issue of Spain. 1952.

References

British philatelists
1885 births
1962 deaths
Signatories to the Roll of Distinguished Philatelists
Fellows of the Royal Philatelic Society London